El Encuentro (English: The Encounter) is a live album by Mexican pop singer Mijares. This album was released on 21 November 1995. Sometimes is called "Akustic". This album was produced by Oscar López. It's a live collection of his old hits and some new songs. Recorded live at Televisa's San Angel Studios, Mexico City, Mexico on 9 August 1995.

History
This concert was recorded for the Mexican television, when Televisa pretended to make some musical programs called "Akustic" alike the concept of MTV Unplugged. For this concert he had some special guests like: Lucero, Barrio Boyzz and the Argentinean Patricia Sosa where they sang the Spanish version of the Italian song "Ti lascerò" which was originally recorded by Anna Oxa and  Fausto Leali. It has 2 new songs (apart from the duets): "Mi única droga eres tú" (My only drug is you) and "El corazón sigue aferrado" (The heart is still grappled).

Track listing
Tracks:
 Volverás
 No Se Murió el Amor
 Tan solo
 Mi Única Droga Eres Tú
 Medley (Para Amarnos Mas / Me Acordare De Ti / Que Nada Nos Separe / Para Amarnos Mas
 Tarde O Temprano (Duet with Barrio Boyzz)
 Palabras de Mujer/ Perfidia
 El Corazón Sigue Aferrado
 El Breve Espacio en Que No Estás
 Te dejaré (Ti Lascero) (Duet with Patricia Sosa)
 Corazón Salvaje
 Soldado del Amor
 Cuatro Veces Amor (Duet with Lucero)
 Bella
 No Hace Falta
 Uno Entre Mil
 Medley 2 (Bonita / A Pedir Su Mano / Para Nene Para / Bonita)

Singles
 Cuatro veces amor
 Tarde o Temprano
 Tan Solo

Lucero Duet
"Hasta que se me hizo Manuelito..." (It means something like "Finally my dream has been come true, Manuelito..."); this is the phrase which Lucero is heard at the beginning of the song "4 Veces Amor" (4 Times Love) their first duet ever, the song was a gigantic success that helped the sales of the album.

Single Charts

Credits

Special Guests
 Lucero
 Barrio Boyzz
 Patricia Sosa

Background Vocals
 Amaury López
 Doris Eugenio

Percussion
 Armando Espinoza
 Sammy Figueroa
 Graham Hawthorne

Guitars
 Kevin Reed
 Ira Siegel

Winds
 Bobby Martinez (Saxophone)
 Isidro Martínez (Trumpet)

Arranger & Keyboards
 Didi Gutman (also organ)
 Amaury Lopez

Others
Mastering:
 Don Grossinger

Mixing
 David Dachinger

Set Up:
 Adolfo Pérez Butro (Photography)
 Luis Miguel Menendez (Photography)
 Jose Luis Mijares (Graphic Design, Illustrations)

Executive Producer:
 Mario Ruiz

Reference list

Manuel Mijares albums
1995 live albums
1995 albums